Sir Malcolm Kenneth McIntosh  (1945-2000) was an Australian scientist and senior public servant.

Life and career
Malcolm McIntosh was born in Melbourne on 14 December 1945. He was schooled at Telopea Park School, going on to study physics at both undergraduate and doctorate level at the Australian National University.

In 1990, McIntosh was appointed Secretary of the Department of Industry, Technology and Commerce.

In 1991, he was recruited by the British Ministry of Defence to the position of Chief of Defence Procurement. He received a knighthood at the end of this term in January 1996, for public service. He also received the United States Department of Defence Medal for his work during this period.

Between 1996 and 2000, McIntosh was the head of the Commonwealth Scientific and Industrial Research Organisation (CSIRO).

McIntosh died in Melbourne on 7 February 2000, after acquiring an infection whilst suffering from cancer.

Awards
McIntosh was appointed a Companion of the Order of Australia in January 1999 for service to excellence in scientific and technological research, to providing new opportunities for industries, and to Australian Defence industry and science policy. He had already been awarded a British knighthood and a US Department of Defense Medal for Distinguished Public Service.

Malcolm McIntosh's work is now commemorated in the Malcolm McIntosh Prize for Physical Scientist of the Year. His life and legacy is honoured every year at the annual Malcolm McIntosh Lecture.

References

1945 births
2000 deaths
Australian public servants
Australian scientists
Companions of the Order of Australia
Australian National University alumni
Australian Knights Bachelor